The 2014–15 Scottish Championship is the 20th season in the current format of 10 teams in the second tier of Scottish football.

Heart of Midlothian won the title on 22 March 2015 and secured their return to the Scottish Premiership with a record seven matches remaining, after Rangers defeated city rivals Hibernian 2–0. This marked the first time since the 1984-85 season that a side in the same division as an Old Firm club won a league title in Scotland.

Teams
Rangers were promoted as 2013–14 Scottish League One champions, whilst Heart of Midlothian were relegated from the 2013–14 Scottish Premiership. Hibernian finished 11th in the Premiership and were eventually relegated after a play-off against Hamilton Academical, losing a penalty shoot-out following a 2–2 draw on aggregate over two legs.

Stadia and locations

Stadia by capacity and locations

Personnel and kits

Managerial changes

League table

Results
Teams play each other four times in this league. In the first half of the season each team plays every other team twice (home and away) and then do the same in the second half of the season, for a total of 36 games.

First half of season

Second half of season

Championship play-offs

The second bottom team in the Championship enters into a 4 team playoff with the teams from 2nd to 4th from League One

Semi-finals
All times British Summer Time (UTC+1)

First leg

Second leg

Alloa win 2-1 on aggregate

Forfar win 4-1 on aggregate

Final
The two semi-final winners enter a two-legged play-off, the winner of which is awarded a place in the 2015–16 Scottish Championship.

First leg

Second leg

Alloa win 4-3 on aggregate

Top scorers

References

Scottish Championship seasons
2014–15 Scottish Professional Football League
2
Scot